An Online panel is a group of selected research participants who have agreed to provide information at specified intervals over an extended period of time. 

A panel can be distinguished from a database in the following ways: 

Its members are asked to provide additional information about themselves and their household, such as demographics, ownership and lifestyle information
an ongoing relationship exists with the panel brand
there is often a systematic reward mechanism unique to the panel
 the members do not receive direct marketing messages as a result of their membership.

Online panels could be for B2C or B2B. In B2B panels, a selective group of panelists will be involved like "retail owners panel" which would have retail owners as panel members.

See also
 Computer-assisted telephone interviewing
 Computer-assisted personal interviewing
 Automated computer telephone interviewing
 Official statistics
 Bureau of Labor Statistics
Questionnaires
Questionnaire construction
Paid survey
Data Mining
NIPO Software
DIY research
SPSS

References
Survey methodology